Sir Ernest Albert Vasey (1901 – 10 January 1984) was a British colonial politician and actor.

Early life
Born in Maryport and son of an actress, he spent much of his early life touring the country with his mother and attending various elementary schools until the age of twelve. After leaving school at twelve, he supported himself through acting and other means, until he settled in Shrewsbury in 1922, married, and began taking part in local politics.

Political career
In 1928, he became chairman of the Shrewsbury Junior Imperial League, and was elected to the local council as an independent conservative. His colonial career began in 1935 when he holidayed to Kenya and decided to move there (in 1936).

Kenya
Vasey initially found work as a cinema manager, but soon got involved in local politics; being elected to Nairobi Municipal Council for the Westland's Ward in 1938. He later rose to Mayor of Nairobi, serving between 1941-1942 and 1944-1946. Vasey married again in 1944 (it isn't clear what happened to his first wife). He was awarded a Companion of the Order of St Michael and St George (CMG) in 1945.

Sources
SOAS page on Vasey
 

Mayors of Nairobi
1901 births
1984 deaths